Muriel Hutchison (February 10, 1915 – March 24, 1975) was an American actress.

A stage actress in the 1930s, 1940s and 1950s, she also appeared in the films Partners in Crime, ...One Third of a Nation..., The Women, Another Thin Man and Joe and Ethel Turp Call on the President.

Broadway plays in which Hutchison appeared included The Vigil (1948), Proof Thro' the Night (1942), The Land Is Bright (1941), The Man Who Came to Dinner (1939), Lightnin''' (1938), Merely Murder (1937), The Amazing Dr. Clitterhouse (1937), and The Sap Runs High'' (1936).

She died of cancer on March 24, 1975, in Manhattan, New York City, New York at age 60.

Filmography

References

External links
 

1915 births
1975 deaths
20th-century American actresses
American film actresses
Actresses from New York City